Potamogeton distinctus, the pondweed, is an aquatic plant species in the genus Potamogeton. It is found in slow moving fresh water. It is widely distributed in the east of temperate Asia (the Russian Far East, China and Eastern Asia), tropical Asia (the Indian Subcontinent, Indo-China and Malesia) and also grows in the Southwestern Pacific.

Description
Aquatic herb.

References

Flora of China
Flora of Eastern Asia
Flora of Indo-China
Flora of Malesia
Flora of the Indian subcontinent
Flora of the Russian Far East
Flora of the Southwestern Pacific
Freshwater plants
distinctus